A rector of a Dutch university is called a rector magnificus. The following people have been rector magnificus of the Vrije Universiteit Amsterdam:

Publication 
 A.Th. van Deursen: The distinctive character of the Free University in Amsterdam, 1880-2005. A commemorative history. Grand Rapids, Michigan, William B. Eerdmans Publishing Company, 2008.

References 
 Jaarboek Vrije Universiteit Amsterdam, 1880-1990 (digital)

Lists of office-holders in the Netherlands
Science-related lists
Vrije Universiteit Amsterdam
 
 
Lists of Dutch people by occupation